Rosalie Pépin is a Canadian actress from Quebec. She is most noted for her performance as Émilie in the film Vacarme, for which she received a Canadian Screen Award nomination for Best Supporting Actress at the 9th Canadian Screen Awards, and a Prix Iris nomination for Revelation of the Year at the 23rd Quebec Cinema Awards.

References

External links

21st-century Canadian actresses
Canadian film actresses
Canadian child actresses
Actresses from Quebec
Living people
Year of birth missing (living people)